Fixed Bayonets! is a 1951 American war film written and directed by Samuel Fuller and produced by Twentieth Century-Fox during the Korean War. It is Fuller's second film about the Korean War. In his motion-picture debut, James Dean appears briefly at the conclusion of the film.

Plot
The film is set in the first winter of the Korean War during the Red Chinese intervention. The story follows the fate of a lone 48-man platoon left as a rear guard to defend a choke point to cover the withdrawal of their division over an exposed bridge. Command of the platoon falls upon Cpl. Denno, who has an innate aversion to responsibility for the lives of others.

Cast
 Richard Basehart as Cpl. Denno
 Gene Evans as Sgt. Rock
 Michael O'Shea as Sgt. Lonergan
 Richard Hylton as Medic John Wheeler
 Craig Hill as Lt. Gibbs
 Skip Homeier as Whitey
 John Doucette as the Colonel
 Pat Hogan as Jonesy

Soundtrack
Roy Webb composed the film's score using two songs.

 American Flag
 Indiana
Music by James F. Hanley
Lyrics by Ballard MacDonald

Production
Fixed Bayonets! was the first film of a seven-picture deal between Twentieth Century-Fox and writer/director Samuel Fuller. Fox had been impressed with Fuller's The Steel Helmet and sought to make another film about the contemporary subject of the Korean War.

After having problems with The Steel Helmet, the army assigned Medal of Honor recipient Raymond Harvey as the film's technical advisor. Fuller, himself a decorated World War II veteran, forged a lasting bond with Harvey, who again served as technical adviser in the 1958 film Verboten!. Fixed Bayonets! also included the first appearance, albeit uncredited, of James Dean in a feature film.

Though the film's script is an original screenplay, Darryl F. Zanuck felt that the story of a reluctant corporal's unwillingness to take command was reminiscent of Fox's Immortal Sergeant, so Fox ordered a screen credit for the writer of that film, Lamar Trotti.

According to Fuller, it was difficult to find extras for the opening retreat sequence, as many action films were also in production at the time. A production assistant was able to find some dancers from a musical and Fuller convincingly simulated the soldiers' fatigue and depression by loading the extras' uniforms and packs with heavy weights.

Though the US 1st Infantry Division did not serve in Korea, Fuller named the general and regimental commander after the men under whom he had served in World War II and named the regiments after his own as well.

References

External links

 
 
 
 

1951 films
1951 war films
American war films
Films directed by Samuel Fuller
1950s English-language films
Films scored by Roy Webb
20th Century Fox films
American black-and-white films
James Dean
Films based on British novels
Korean War films
1950s American films